Cauchy Muamba (born May 8, 1987) is a Congolese-born Canadian football player who plays defensive back and is currently a free agent. He most recently played for the Montreal Alouettes of the Canadian Football League (CFL). He was drafted 34th overall by the BC Lions in the 2010 CFL Draft and signed a contract with the team on May 25, 2010. He played CIS football for the St. Francis Xavier X-Men.

He grew up in Mississauga with his younger brothers Hénoc and Kelvin.

References

External links 
 Cauchy Muamba at BC Lions
 Cauchy Muamba at Edmonton Eskimos

1987 births
Living people
BC Lions players
Canadian football defensive backs
Edmonton Elks players
Sportspeople from Kinshasa
Sportspeople from Mississauga
St. Francis Xavier X-Men football players
Democratic Republic of the Congo players of Canadian football
Democratic Republic of the Congo emigrants to Canada
Winnipeg Blue Bombers players
Saskatchewan Roughriders players
Montreal Alouettes players